Dufferin is a former provincial electoral division in Manitoba, Canada.  It was originally created in 1879 as two divisions, Dufferin North and Dufferin South.  Dufferin was consolidated into a single constituency for the 1888 provincial election, but was eliminated with the 1892 election.

Dufferin returned to the electoral map for the 1903 election, and was eliminated through redistribution in 1969.

The constituency was represented for many years by Rodmond Roblin, who served as Premier of Manitoba from 1900 to 1915.  Roblin's grandson, who also served as premier, was named "Dufferin".

Provincial representatives for Dufferin North

Provincial representatives for Dufferin South

Provincial representatives for Dufferin

Former provincial electoral districts of Manitoba